Rybář (feminine: Rybářová) is a Czech language surname literally meaning "fisher" or "fisherman". The Slovak-language equivalent is Rybár. 
Notable people with this surname include:

 (1931–2021), Czech Roman Catholic priest 
Jana Rybářová (synchronized swimmer) (born 1978), Czech Olympic synchronized swimmer
Jana Rybářová (actress) (1936–1957), Czech film actress
Jorge Rybar, Guatemalan industrialist, on a 1998 Guatemalan postage stamp
Otokar Rybář (1865–1927), Austrian and Yugoslavian politician, diplomat and statesman
Peter Rybar  (1913–2002), Czech-Swiss violinist
Silvie Rybářová (born 1985), Czech open water swimmer
Vladimir Rybář (1894–1946), Yugoslav diplomat and lawyer

See also
 

Occupational surnames
Czech-language surnames